= Gearbreakers =

2021 novel by Zoe Hana Mikuta

- First edition
- Author: Zoe Hana Mikuta
- Genre: Science fiction, fantasy
- Publisher: Feiwel & Friends
- Publication date: July 29, 2021
- Publication place: South Africa
- Media type: Print, e-Book
- Pages: 416
- ISBN: 9781250269508 (first edition)
- Followed by: Godslayers

Gearbreakers is a novel written by American novelist Zoe Hana Mikuta. It was first published by Feiwel & Friends, an imprint of Macmillan Publishers.
